Karuvanpadi is one of the growing towns/suburbs near Pattambi. It is one of the important trading centres in the area. Karuvanpadi is situated in Parudur panchayath, on Pattambi-Pallippuram road. A diversion from Karuvanpadi centre through Kodumunda road connects Karuvanpadi with the Pattambi–Pallippuram road in Kodumunda centre.

Cities and towns in Palakkad district